"S Out" (stylized as "s Out" and short for "Bottom's Out") is an episode produced for the second series of the British television sitcom Bottom. For reasons of sensitivity, however, it did not air on its original scheduled date of 5 November 1992, eventually being shown in the UK nearly three years after it was produced, and after every episode of Series 3. It is the second of three episodes that do not feature Richie and Eddie's flat.

Synopsis 
To avoid losing a £50 bet, Richie and Eddie must spend a week camping out in Wimbledon Common. When they arrive, they notice their selected spot is covered in dog excrement – to which Richie says that they cannot camp there as they are "not French". After moving one step further away, Richie prepares to set up camp, then admonishes Eddie for forgetting to bring the tin opener. Eddie shows that he has actually brought the opener, then Richie realises that he forgot to bring the tins.

Fortunately Eddie has brought along a delicious packet of chocolate Hobnobs, which he refuses to share with Richie. A fight breaks out which includes Richie getting a tent pole in his eye, and the biscuits end up being flung into a nearby polluted pond. Richie then tries to punch Eddie in the face but ends up getting punched in the crotch and then in the face by Eddie, the fight ends with the pair knocking each other out. While drying some of the wet Hobnobs over a fire they debate the existence (and edibility) of Wombles; when Eddie spots a hedgehog (which he believes to be Great Uncle Bulgaria) the two try to kill it using a tent pole as a blowgun with pub darts as missiles. When Richie is hit by the darts (the first hitting him in the back of the head & the second attaching his hand to a rock) he demands the blowgun from Eddie so he can exact revenge. However, he only worsens his situation by swallowing a dart after blowing inwards. When Eddie manages to get it out and the dart once again hits Richie, Richie becomes enraged and throws it into the polluted pond.

Richie finds and divides a fish with the dart from the pond, but Eddie refuses to eat his half. Richie cooks his half and eats it, but declares it "disgusting!" Eddie produces some Scotch and downs the lot, drinking himself into a stupor. As Richie muses how nothing interesting or exciting happens in the countryside, a mad man (credited as "Mr. Tent") runs up to them cackling manically, flashes at them and flees, still guffawing. Richie is taken aback and begins to wonder why people even bother to do it "with something as small as that". He then decides to retire to the tent for a sleep.

Later at night at Richie's request, Eddie ties Richie tighter into his sleeping bag as a storm begins to brew outside. An owl hoots, frightening Richie who fears that there is some dark and evil force lurking in the night, waiting to consume them. Eddie responds that it is "the fish repeating on you". The two begin to hear more noises, which Eddie believes are the Wombles coming to get them. Eddie attempts to build a fire in the tent to ward them off, only to cause an explosion that burns his and Richie's faces. As the storm continues, a dark shadow appears creeping outside the tent. Richie tells Eddie to help him out of his sleeping bag so they can flee, but there is no time. Eddie zips the tent closed and they both watch with fright as it slowly starts unzipping again. It is revealed to be the flasher from before, who grabs the tent and thrusts his genitals inside. Richie and Eddie scream, and Eddie quickly zips the tent back up, painfully catching the man's genitals in the zip. The flasher screams in agony and runs off, taking the whole tent wrapped around his genitals with him. After this now getting wet from the rain Eddie decides to forfeit the £50 bet and go home, but Richie cannot get out of his sleeping bag. Before leaving, Eddie knocks Richie out with a tent mallet.

Production and broadcast 
Although now generally referred to as episode six of the second series, this episode did not air in the UK for almost three years after it was made. On 15 July 1992, following the episode's production, Rachel Nickell was murdered on Wimbledon Common. As the episode was set there, the BBC accordingly decided to withhold domestic transmission for reasons of sensitivity. It was, however, included in overseas sales packages, and was screened in New Zealand in 1993. The episode was released on video in the UK that same year, and was finally broadcast there on 10 April 1995, two months after the end of the third series – making it the last episode of the entire Bottom run to be aired.

Cast

References

External links

1992 British television episodes
Bottom (TV series)
Camping
Wimbledon, London